Viljar Helland Vevatne (born 7 December 1994) is a Norwegian footballer who plays as a defender for Viking FK.

Career
Vevatne started his career with Viking, where he was a part of the youth academy. He did not manage to break through to the first team, so he instead joined Bryne in 2014, where he signed his first professional contract. On 25 July 2016, he joined Sandnes Ulf, after an unsuccessful spell with Brann, where he only made three first team appearances. He returned to Viking ahead of the 2018 season, signing a three-year contract. On 13 December 2019, he signed a contract extension keeping him at the club until the end of the 2022 season.

Career statistics

Honours
Viking
 1. divisjon: 2018
 Norwegian Football Cup: 2019

References

1994 births
Living people
Sportspeople from Stavanger
Norwegian footballers
Norway youth international footballers
Viking FK players
Bryne FK players
SK Brann players
Sandnes Ulf players
Norwegian First Division players
Eliteserien players
Association football defenders